Hut Cove is a small cove in the eastern part of Hope Bay between Seal Point and Grunden Rock, at the northeastern end of the Antarctic Peninsula. It was discovered by a party under J. Gunnar Andersson of the Swedish Antarctic Expedition, 1901–04, who wintered at Hope Bay in 1903. The cove was so named in 1945 by the Falkland Islands Dependencies Survey because they, like the Swedish expedition, established a base hut on the southern shore of this cove.

See also
Jagged Rocks

References

Coves of Graham Land
Landforms of Trinity Peninsula